City of Champions may refer to:

Cities
 Artesia, New Mexico, US city nicknamed by local radio host, Dave Button, because of the success of the local football team (31 state championships)
 Brockton, Massachusetts, US city nicknamed due to the success of native boxers 
 Inglewood, California, US city nicknamed due to success of the Los Angeles Lakers and Los Angeles Kings
 Los Angeles, California, US city nicknamed after the Los Angeles Lakers and Los Angeles Dodgers championships within 16 days of each other in 2020 (see List of city nicknames in California)
 Detroit, US city nicknamed during the 1930s
Duncanville, Texas
 One of several Boston nicknames
 One of several nicknames for Pittsburgh
 One of several nicknames for Tampa; see List of city nicknames in Florida
 Unofficial slogan of Edmonton, capital of the Canadian province of Alberta
 Newly named slogan for Denver, the capital of [Colorado]. This is due to multiple championships in several hockey championships throughout 2022. This includes but is not limited to: the NCAA championship being won by the University of Denver, the Stanley Cup going to the Colorado Avalanche, and East High School (Denver, Colorado) winning the national championship for high school hockey. The city is also referred to at times as Hockeytown, USA.

Other uses
 Countess, a riverboat in Pittsburgh's Gateway Clipper Fleet formerly named City of Champions
 SoFi Stadium, a stadium in Inglewood, California,  known as City of Champions Stadium during planning

See also
Titletown (disambiguation)